Saülo Mercader is a Spanish painter, sculptor and essayist. He was born on September 13, 1944, in San Vicente del Raspeig (Alicante, Spain). He has lived in Paris since 1975.

Together with paintings and sculptures Saülo Mercader creates pieces of art in different fields such as ceramics, high-warp tapestries, engravings, drawings, terracotta and lithographies.
His works are not linked with a special trend in visual arts. They are inspired by the events that take place in society and in his life. He feels that he is a witness of his Time and a chaman that links Humankind with the Universe where all kinds of life comes from. He is a go-between through his art creations.

Biography 
Saülo Mercader started modelling and drawing when he was six-years old. He learnt the different techniques of modelling in the « Fallas » workshops in Alicante. He was an apprentice in the sculptor Serrano's workshops which allowsed him to master the different steps in the making of bronze sculptures : from moulding to different processes of casting.

In 1964 he arrived in Bilbao (The Basque country in the North of Spain) where his artistic career started. He made himself known through a series of collective and individual exhibitions. This exceptional osmosis between the people and himself remained extraordinary for two decades and received a considerable echo in the media: in the written press as well as in audio and TV reports. As the disciple of the sculptor Lucarini, he carved on stone and worked on bronze doing a series of remarkable busts as well as painted portraits such as the one of the Marquis de Lozoya in Segovia.

One of his paintings : Peras en Primavera was acquired by the Fine Arts Museum in Madrid. The Spanish Vocation Fund Prize he gets in 1972 rewards his talent, fortitude and authentic artistic vocation. Saülo Mercader's popularity increases. He went to Rome thanks to a scholarship given by the Castellblanch Catalan company. In Italy, he studied the great masters who inspired him and guided his hands when he was young and mainly Raphaël, Leonardo da Vinci towards whom he feels a strong brotherly attraction in art.

Back from Italy, he left for Scandinavia. Later on, he stayed for a few months in the Lowlands.

Because of deadly floods in Bilbao that destroyed his studio, he lost a great part of his works as well as books, letters, photos.

In 1974, he received a grant from the French government, which allowed him to stay in Paris and develop his art productions. It is an important turn in his life. He lives at the Cité internationale des arts for five years and meet a lot of artists from all around the world: painters, sculptors, comedians, musicians, ballet-dancers, writers. These encounters enlarged his vision of art. He participated in the most important art shows in the capital : Salon de Mai, Salon d’Automne, Grands et Jeunes d’Aujourd’hui, Jeune Sculpture, Salon des Artistes Français, Contradiction, Outre-Couleur. In the Cité Internationale des Arts’ workshops he starts weaving high-warp tapestries guided by Jagoda Buic and Nora Music and meets the weaver Marin Varbanov there. He follows S. W Hayter's courses in carving as well as Matthey's courses in painting at the Superior National School of Fine arts in Paris.

Thanks to his exhibition at the International Contemporary Art Fair (FIAC) in 1978 in Paris, he became well known to the European public.

These were years when he created a lot of works and travelled extensively.

In 1981, he received an American Fulbright grant: he went to New York City where he worked for a couple of years. He lived on the campus of Columbia University and followed Professors Mahoney's and Maxwell's courses on lithography and Professor Schorr's courses on painting at Teachers' College, where he realized a series of ceramics with Panay Reyes. He isolated himself for a while to paint a few large paintings on the theme of American football whose exhibitions are outstanding and called the attention of the press and the media that make him be known by the New York public.

At the same time, he painted five extra large paintings on the theme of the Tree that will be exhibited at the Biennial of Alexandria.

He received the Master of Arts and Education degree at Teachers' College, Columbia University. Later on, he met Andy Warhol, Roy Lichtenstein and Niki de Saint Phalle. They were very prolific years that Saülo Mercader describes in his numerous illustrated note books as well as in his graphic works.

Back to Paris, he earned a doctoral degree in visual arts cum laude at Paris VIII University in 1986. He meets Tapies, Semprun and Camilo José Cela. He exhibited regularly in the capital and travelled mainly to Spain, where he became acquainted with Francis Bacon, in Madrid.

Greece and particularly Crete and its mythology inspired him a fresco of large dimensions (720 × 420 cm) entitled : L’Attente du Minotaure which belongs to the Tzovaridis's art collection in Athens. While he sojourns in the Naxos island in the Cyclads, he draws a series of works inspired by the Cycladic art.

In Turkey and in Cyprus, Saülo Mercader is confronted with the Eastern cultures and art, its traditions and architecture that are so many sources of prolific inspiration to him. He exhibits a few paintings in Istanbul at the Biennal of Contemporary Art; then in Bodrum, in Nicosia where the encounters with Turkish and Chypriot artists such as Aylin Örek, Habib Gerez, Feti Arda allow him to discover a new and rich world in creativity that nourish and inspire his creations.

In Germany, his palette of colours get brighter and his subjects get more daring forms in Berlin as well as in Düsseldorf and Köln where he exhibits. In Brussels and Ostende, he paints misty landscapes. In

Amsterdam, he visits the treasures at the Rijksmuseum and the self-portraits of Van Gogh at the Van Gogh Museum. He exhibits in Utrecht, inspired by its romantic canals : all those places are mines of so many awaken dreams to Saülo Mercader who paints, carves, draws, writes about his experiences, what he sees, the people he meets. In Paris, he is acquainted with Alechinski and Valerio Adami.

The city of Figeac (in the Lot region, South of France) welcomes two exhibitions in 1995 and 2000 on the Minotaur theme : Les Hurlements du Taureau, hailed by the media : written press, audio and TV reports. It is in 2000 inside the art gallery that he paints one of his major works : la Bachannale des Minotaures. This very large painting is successively shown with a series of minotaurs at the Palacio del Infantado in Guadalajara and in Alicante (Spain).

Saülo Mercader has always been interested in transmitting his knowledge He was often invited to animate classes among young pupils. He participates in a program : L’Art à l’Ecole with itinerant exhibitions and punctual conferences sponsored by The Ministry of Youth and Sports.
Saülo Mercader often travels to his native country. His exhibition : El Euro y Los Minotauros (2002–2003) at the Lonja del Pescado in Alicante is sponsored by Alicante Townhall, the Consortium of museums and the Generalitat of Valencia. He regularly exhibits in the French provinces. His exhibition : Les hologénies de l’Etron at the Cervantes Cultural Institute in Toulouse (South of France) surprises by the originality of its theme.

A few years later, he has the honour to represent the Spanish artists living in Paris during a reception given at the Spanish Embassy where he met king Juan Carlos.

In 2012, he is officially invited by the French Embassy in Astana (Kazakhstan) where he exhibits his paintings on the occasion of the French National Feast (July 14). The press, media, audio and TV reports speak abundantly of his exhibition.

During his stay in Kazakhstan and Ouzbekistan, he visited extraordinary places such as the Tangaly Petroglyphs, ancient monuments on the Silk Road thraught with History and legends, Mongol and Asian architecture, his visit at Edouard Kazarian's workshop in Almaty, valuable museums, all those treasures that are sources of inspiration that Saülo Mercader exploits with bulimia.

He often goes to Spain to do public works, stone or bronze busts, painted portraits and to exhibit as well. He exceptionally participated at the Fallas in Alicante in 2007 by making a bull with diverse materials in the pure tradition of the Ninots. It reminded him of his early years as an apprentice when he learnt all the techniques of constructions (mostly frameworks) in the building of the Fallas.

Distinctions 
Saülo Mercader gets the Prize of the Vocation Fund (Barcelone – Spain); He gets a grant from the French Government. In 1981, he gets the Fulbright Grant.

He is Commander in the Order of the Arts and Letters (French Ministry of Culture). He is awarded the Vermeil Medal of the City of Paris.

Works

Paintings 
There are different periods in his creations according to the places he lives. The Catalan period inspired him tormented landscapes and subjects with symbolical elements : keys, candlesticks, twilights, the moon, portraits and self-portraits. In Paris he paints what he calls « the Green series » mainly urban people, tramps, homeless, mothers with child, picturesque and poetical tales. Later on, the tauromachia scenes and a series of minotaurs are so many themes that denounce censure, injustices, solitude, wars. He paints a very large painting entitled : La Bacchanale des Minotaures, exhibited in Figeac, an exhibition sponsored by the DRAC(Direction Régionale d’Art Contemporain), by the Conseil Régional du Lot (South-west of France) and by the Spanish Embassy.

In New-York, he is influenced by the American football, the American way of life, the Native Americans and urban landscapes : towers, skyscrapers. The themes of the couple and mothers with child are recurrent.

Inspired by the Australian Aborigenes’culture and traditions, he paints some 70 canvasses that symbolize their Dream Time Mythology.

Each trip abroad is a source of inspiration and productions of works.

Sculptures 
Saülo Mercader is interested in different materials whether it be terrecotta, ceramics, stone, marble, bronze. In 2007, he creates a monument which is a commanded for the City of San Vicente del Raspeig (Alicante, Spain). It is called : Dona Lluna. The bronze sculpture is 5m50 high and stands in the middle of a rotunda. It is surrounded with 12 painted pieces of raw marbles that represent a lunar calendar. This monument is a heathen temple dedicated to Womankind unique in Europe.

Tapestries 
In the late 70 s, Saülo Mercader weaves some high-warp tapestries called « sacred ». Among them, let us note : Anamnèse, la Fatijah and Rotor III, a large three-dimensional tapestry inspired by the volumes in sculpture and by Sheila Hicks’s textile creations. He mixes up diverse fabrics such as plastic tubes, corks, cloth that are woven and inserted into the cotton and woollen threads.

Main exhibitions and collections 
Saülo Mercader's works were exhibited at the FIAC (International Contemporary Art Fair in Paris – 1978 as well as in all the main French Salons in the capital : Salon d’Automne / Salon de Mai / Salon de la Jeune Sculpture / Salon des Artistes Français / Figuration Critique/ Comparaisons/ Outre-Couleur/ École Française/ Festival d’Art Sacré de Tournus/ Bordeaux, Mérignac/ Clermond-Ferrand), Versailles.

His works are regularly exhibited in Spain (including the two remarkable ones in Guadalajara and Alicante (50)(51), in France; they represent France and Spain at international Biennals : Genève, Alexandria, Valparaiso, Istanbul Festival, in Kazakhstan and in more than a hundred one-man shows round the world.

Saülo Mercader's works are present in numerous private and public collections in the world : The Museum of Contemporary Art in Madrid (Peras en Primavera), the French National Library (engravings at Richelieu site « The poet »), Teachers’ College, Columbia University in New-York City (« The Eight Profiles »), a few works at the Bodrum Art and Archeology Museum (Turkey), State Turkish Museum (« Equilibrium of the Mind »), City of Tarragone and City of Guadalajara (Spain), Tzovaridis's collection in Athens (« L’Attente du Minotaure ») and more others.

Publications

Books of the artiste 
 
 1993 : « Art, Matière, Énergie » aux éditions Imago- PUF- France
commentaire biblio|It is a book about the theory of Art and an analytical approach of the different components in the artistic creation.

 2000 : Les Chants de l'Ombre aux éditions Imago-PUF-France
China ink drawings by the author and prefaced by Yves Coppens. 
Saülo Mercader tells with decency, poetic accents and an honest vision his years as a child and young man in his country : Spain in the times of Franquism and its inhuman regime.

 2010 : Extrate-Art, Vision de lo invisible. written in castillan. It is the artist's personal vision about artistic creativity. He writes his belief in an osmosis between the Universe and Humankind and makes us travel in boundless worlds with invisible frontiers where the artist (himself) becomes a chaman(52) (53). The French version of this book is published later on, prefaced by the historian Bartolomé Bennassar. The book is printed in limited numbers with two different covers illustrated by the author.
 His testimonies on the Franquist period in Spain have been published in French and Spanish books : » Traumas-ninos de la Guerra y del exilio and « Enfants de la Mémoire » (Edition of the Association Memoria Historica y democratica del Baix Llobregat, Spain).

Bibliographies 

Numerous exhibition catalogues and monographies have been printed on Saülo Mercader's works.

 (spanish) La Gran Enciclopedia Basca, 1975 (Painting and Sculpture chapters) (Painting and Sculpture chapters)
 (spanish) Saülo Mercader, Madrid, Colección Arte Contemporáneo n° 65, Fernando Ponce, 1989
 (french, english, spanish) Saülo Mercader, Moi le Roi, Madrid, Fernando Ponce, 1992 including 280 colour reproductions
 (spanish, basque language) poems by Marrodan, El Viaje de las Musas, 1993. Boxes limited to 20 specimens with 10 engravings by Saülo Mercader.
 (french, english, spanish) text by J. Rivais, Saülo Mercader, Guadalajara Townhall, 1999 – 250 colour reproductions (paintings).
 (french, english, spanish) El Euro y los Minotauros, Alicante Townhall and the Consortium of Museums – Generalitat Valenciana – Spain, 2002. These monographies contain respectively 150 and 75 colour reproductions (paintings, sculptures, ceramics, tapestries, engravings, drawings).

Written Press – audio and TV reports 
The American newspapers and TV channels have hailed Saülo Mercader's shows in New-York considering them as ones of the very important artistic events of the season (Daily News, Village Voice, New York Post…). The Spanish press(« Informacion, El Pais, El Correo), the French one(Paris Match/ Le Journal du dimanche, La Dépêche du Midi, Nice-Matin), the German one, the Pravda, dedicate extensive articles about his exhibitions in their newspapers as well as on TV channels 41 and 47 (American). He is regularly interviewed in programmes on the radio and TV channels in Spain and in France (France Inter Cosmopolitaine. TF1 Le 7 à 8 by Laurence Ferrari, documentary : « Les enfants de Franco » by Bénédicte Duran, « Au plaisir de l’œil » de Micheline Sandrel).
Saülo Mercader regularly exhibits in France and punctually abroad.

References

External links
 website about Saülo Mercader's Art Work.
site about the artist
page above the artist.

1944 births
Living people
Modern painters
Artists from the Valencian Community
20th-century Spanish painters
20th-century Spanish male artists
Spanish male painters
21st-century Spanish painters
Spanish sculptors
Spanish male sculptors
Spanish printmakers
Spanish contemporary artists
20th-century sculptors
20th-century printmakers
People from Alicante
21st-century Spanish male artists